"No Puedo Olvidarte" is a Spanish-language song written by Cuauhtémoc González García and recorded by Regional Mexican band Beto y sus Canarios. It was also the lead single from the Ardientes album. The song reached number one on the Billboard Regional Mexican Airplay chart in 2005.

Weekly charts

References

Beto y sus Canarios songs
2005 songs
2005 singles